The following lists events that happened during 1886 in Chile.

Incumbents
President of Chile: Domingo Santa María (until September 18), José Manuel Balmaceda

Events

June
15 June - Chilean presidential election, 1886

Births
date unknown - Oscar Novoa
21 August - Max Jara (d. 1965)

Deaths
25 January - Benjamín Vicuña Mackenna (b. 1831)
13 May - Patricio Lynch (b. 1825)
5 June - Antonio Varas (b. 1817)
3 September - José Miguel Barriga Castro (b. 1816)
6 September - Vicente Pérez Rosales (b. 1807)

References 

 
Years of the 19th century in Chile
Chile